Kerrobert is a former provincial electoral district for the Legislative Assembly of the province of Saskatchewan, Canada. Located in west-central Saskatchewan, this constituency was created before the 3rd Saskatchewan general election in 1912. The district was dissolved and combined with the former Kindersley riding (as Kerrobert-Kindersley) before the 9th Saskatchewan general election in 1938.

It is now part of the present-day Kindersley constituency.

Members of the Legislative Assembly

Election results

|-

 
|Conservative
|John Murton Hanbidge
|align="right"|577
|align="right"|34.86%
|align="right"|–
|- bgcolor="white"
!align="left" colspan=3|Total
!align="right"|1,655
!align="right"|100.00%
!align="right"|

|-

 
|Conservative
|Albert E. Mosses
|align="right"|1,745
|align="right"|48.01%
|align="right"|+13.15
|- bgcolor="white"
!align="left" colspan=3|Total
!align="right"|3,635
!align="right"|100.00%
!align="right"|

|-

|Independent
|James J. Cochrane
|align="right"|1,276
|align="right"|34.08%
|align="right"|–
|- bgcolor="white"
!align="left" colspan=3|Total
!align="right"|3,744
!align="right"|100.00%
!align="right"|

|-

 
|Conservative
|William James Milton McMullen
|align="right"|1,276
|align="right"|37.56%
|align="right"|-
|- bgcolor="white"
!align="left" colspan=3|Total
!align="right"|3,397
!align="right"|100.00%
!align="right"|

|-

|- bgcolor="white"
!align="left" colspan=3|Total
!align="right"|4,100
!align="right"|100.00%
!align="right"|

|-
 
|style="width: 130px"|Conservative
|Robert Hanbidge
|align="right"|3,117
|align="right"|57.33%
|align="right"|-

|- bgcolor="white"
!align="left" colspan=3|Total
!align="right"|5,437
!align="right"|100.00%
!align="right"|

|-

 
|Conservative
|Robert Hanbidge
|align="right"|1,788
|align="right"|29.05%
|align="right"|-28.28
 
|Farmer-Labour
|James Penberthy
|align="right"|1,716
|align="right"|27.88%
|align="right"|-
|- bgcolor="white"
!align="left" colspan=3|Total
!align="right"|6,155
!align="right"|100.00%
!align="right"|

See also 
Electoral district (Canada)
List of Saskatchewan provincial electoral districts
List of Saskatchewan general elections
List of political parties in Saskatchewan
Kerrobert, Saskatchewan

References 
 

Former provincial electoral districts of Saskatchewan